John McGreevey (December 21, 1922 – November 24, 2010) was an American writer and screenwriter. He is the father of former Disney star and Emmy-nominated television writer Michael McGreevey.

Filmography
Films
1969: Hello Down There
1970: Crowhaven Farm
1975: The Runaways
1976: The Disappearance of Aimee
1977: The Death of Richie
1978: Rainbow
1978: The New Adventures of Heidi
1978: Ruby and Oswald (co-written with Michael McGreevey)
1982: Night Crossing
1984: The Return of Marcus Welby, M.D.
1984: Aurora
1984: Flight 90: Disaster on the Potomac
1984: Heller Keller: The Miracle Continues
1985: A Time to Live
1985: Consenting Adult
1988: The Fortunate Pilgrim
1988: Unholy Matrimony
1990: Hiroshima: Out of the Ashes
1990:  Call Me Anna
1996: Born Free: A New Adventure
1993: Firestorm: 72 Hours in Oakland
1995: A Dream Is a Wish Your Heart Makes: The Annette Funicello Story
1996: Captains Courageous
1996: Unabomber: The True Story
1997: Ms. Scrooge

TV Series
 1951: Lights Out (2 episodes)
 1952: Armstrong Circle Theatre (1 episode)
 1954: The Web (4 episodes)
 1954: Danger (2 episodes)
 1954-1957: Lux Video Theatre (2 episodes)
 1955: The Pepsi-Cola Playhouse (4 episodes)
 1955-1956: Star Stage (2 episodes)
1955-1956: Studio 57 (5 episodes)
 1956: Celebrity Playhouse (1 episode)
 1956: Ford Theatre (1 episode)
 1956: Screen Directors Playhouse (2 episodes)
 1956: Lassie (3 episodes)
 1956-1957: Broken Arrow (2 episodes)
 1956-1958: Climax! (10 episodes)
 1956–1959: Zane Grey Theatre (13 episodes)
 1956-1959: General Electric Theater (4 episodes)
 1957: The Californians (1 episode)
 1957: Colt .45 (1 episode)
 1957: Tombstone Territory (unknown episodes)
 1957-1958: Schlitz Playhouse of Stars (3 episodes)
 1957-1959: Trackdown (3 episodes)
 1958: Studio One (1 episode)
 1958: Westinghouse Desilu Playhouse (1 episode)
 1958: Cimarron City (2 episodes)
 1959-1960: Adventures in Paradise (3 episodes)
 1959-1960: Black Saddle (16 episodes)
 1959-1961: Bat Masterson (4 episodes)
 1960: The Chevy Mystery Show (1 episode)
 1960–1967: My Three Sons (35 episodes)
 1961: Michael Shayne (2 episodes)
 1961: Window on Main Street (1 episode)
 1961: Checkmate (1 episode)
 1961-1965: Wagon Train (12 episodes)
 1962: It's a Man's World (2 episodes)
 1963: Laramie (1 episode)
 1963: Route 66 (1 episode)
 1963-1964: Arrest and Trial (2 episodes)
 1963-1964: Grindl (3 episodes)
 1963-1964: The Farmer's Daughter (4 episodes)
 1963–1966: Hazel (9 episodes)
 1964: Voyage to the Bottom of the Sea (1 episode)
 1964: 12 O'Clock High (1 episode)
 1966: The F.B.I. (1 episode)
 1966–1971: Family Affair (22 episodes)
 1967-1970: The Flying Nun (7 episodes)
 1968-1971: Mayberry R.F.D. (7 episodes)
 1969: I Dream of Jeannie (1 episode)
 1969: The Doris Day Show (1 episode)
 1969: That Girl (1 episode)
 1969: My World and Welcome to It (1 episode)
 1969: Here Come the Brides (1 episode)
 1970: The Name (1 episode)
 1970: To Rome with Love (1 episode)
 1970: Nancy (1 episode)
 1970-1971: Nanny and the Professor (7 episodes)
 1971-1972: The Smith Family (6 episodes)
 1972: Circle of Fear (1 episode)
 1972: Honeymoon Suite (1 episode)
 1972: Bridget Loves Bernie (1 episode)
 1972: Owen Marshall, Counselor at Law (1 episode)
 1972-1973: Room 222 (3 episodes)
 1972–1978: The Waltons (20 episodes)
 1974: Doc Elliot (1 episode)
 1974: Lucas Tanner (1 episode)
 1974: Apple's Way (1 episode)
 1975-1981: Insight (6 episodes)
 1979: Roots: The Next Generations (1 episode)

External links
 

1922 births
2010 deaths
American male screenwriters
20th-century American screenwriters
20th-century American male writers
People from Muncie, Indiana
Screenwriters from Indiana